St. Mary's Church is a parish church in the Church of England located in Brighstone, Isle of Wight. The churchyard contains a memorial stone to George Albert Cairns VC.

History

The church is medieval dating from the twelfth century.
The short tower contains a ring of 8 bells all cast by Whitechapel Bell Foundry: six in 1961 with two more added in 2017. The largest weighs 7cwt.
The spire was added in the 17th century.

Today
The church holds an annual Christmas tree festival (the Brighstone Christmas Tree Festival) in conjunction with the one at Mottistone that has become a popular tourist attraction.

This event occurs in four locations: 
St Mary's Church, Brighstone
Brighstone Methodist Church
St. Peter and St. Paul's Church, Mottistone
Wilberforce Hall, Brighstone.

Several hundred entries are created by individuals, groups and businesses, making it one of the biggest festivals of its type.

Parish status

The church is grouped with:
St. Mary's Church, Brighstone
St. Mary's Church, Brook
St. Peter and St. Paul's Church, Mottistone

List of incumbents

Three former Rectors have become Bishops: 
Thomas Ken hymn writer 
Samuel Wilberforce - the youngest son of William Wilberforce 
George Moberly - became Bishop of Salisbury

Organ

The church does not have a pipe organ but instead has an electric one at the west end of the nave. A specification of the former pipe organ can be found on the National Pipe Organ Register.

References

Church of England church buildings on the Isle of Wight
Grade I listed churches on the Isle of Wight
Mary